The General Tire 150 is a  annual ARCA Menards Series race held at Charlotte Motor Speedway in Concord, North Carolina. The inaugural event was held on May 18, 1996 and was won by Tim Steele. The race was originally held during the month of May between 1996 and 2004, after which it was removed from the calendar. The race returned to the series in 2018 and has remained since.

History

ARCA previously ran at Charlotte Motor Speedway from 1996 to 2004. In 1996 and 1997, the series ran three times at the speedway: twice in May and once in either late September or early October. In 1998, the middle race was dropped, leaving just one spring race and one fall race. For 2004, the fall race was dropped, before the track was dropped altogether for the 2005 season.

Past winners

1999: Race shortened due to time constraints.
2004 & 2019: Race lengthened for green-white-checkered finish.
2020: Race cancelled and moved to Kentucky due to the COVID-19 pandemic.

Multiple winners (drivers)

Multiple winners (teams)

Manufacturer wins

Previous races

Second Spring race

The EasyCare Certified 200 was an ARCA Menards Series race run in May of 1996 and 1997. The race was dropped from the schedule for the 1998 season. The middle race had no repeat winners.

Past winners

Fall race

The EasyCare Vehicle Service Contracts 150 was an ARCA Menards Series race run between 1996 and 2003 sometime around October 1. The race was removed for the 2004 season. Tim Steele and Kirk Shelmerdine tie for the most wins at two apiece. In the 2001 event, driver Blaise Alexander was killed in a crash on lap 63.

Past winners

2001: Race shortened to 63 laps due to fatal crash.
2003: Race shortened to 66 laps due to rain.

Multiple winners (drivers)

Multiple winners (teams)

Manufacturer wins

References

External links
 

1996 establishments in North Carolina
1997 disestablishments in North Carolina
2003 disestablishments in North Carolina
ARCA Menards Series races
Recurring sporting events established in 1996
Annual sporting events in the United States
May sporting events
NASCAR races at Charlotte Motor Speedway